"Rocket" is the debut single of Danish singer of Egyptian and Iraqi origin Mohamed Ali taken from his debut and only album Keep It Simple.

He released his single "Rocket" on Sony after coming third in season 2 of the Danish X Factor. The song written by Thomas Blachman and produced by GL Music stayed for 20 weeks in Tracklisten, the official Danish Singles Chart in  2009 peaking at #12 on chart in August 2009.

Track list
The single CD contains: 
"Rocket" (radio edit)
"Rocket" (remix)
"Rocket" (Svenstrup & Vendelboe remix)
"Rocket" (Svenstrup & Vendelboe remix) [radio edit]

Chart performance

References

2009 singles